Events in the year 1799 in India.

Events
 National income - 11,245 million
 Fourth Anglo-Mysore War.
 Storming of Seringapatam and death of Tipu Sahib.
The Nizam of Hyderabad accepts a permanent alliance with the British.
 On 25 October 1799, Serfoji II of Thanjavur cedes the State of Thanjavur to the East India Company, receiving in return an annual income of a lakh of Pagodas.

References

 
India
Years of the 18th century in India